was a Japanese artist associated with the shin hanga (new prints) movement.  Little is known about him, except that he worked with the Kyoto City publisher Happōdō.  He rejected the Western concept that art was an expression of the artist's individuality.  Rather, he embraced the traditional method of producing woodblock prints through the cooperation of a designer (artist), a woodblock carver, a printer, and a publisher.  He also favored traditional Japanese subjects, such as Japanese textiles, kabuki, and ukiyo-e masterpieces.

Prints 
Kojima is best known for his series One Hundred Poetry Illustrations. It consists of 50 woodblock prints. Each print is about a traditional Japanese poem. The series were published by Kondo Happodo in Kyoto in 1932. For the prints he used metallic pigments, gofun, and embossing.

Gallery

References

1907 births
1934 deaths
Japanese printmakers
People of Shōwa-period Japan
Shin hanga artists